Mount Ballard, with an elevation of  is located in Cochise County, Arizona, about  west of Bisbee.

See also 
 List of mountains and hills of Arizona by height

References 

Landforms of Cochise County, Arizona
Mountains of Cochise County, Arizona